There Were Two Bachelors (German: Es waren zwei Junggesellen) is a 1936 German comedy film directed by Franz Seitz and starring Manfred Koempel-Pilot, Adolf Gondrell and Joe Stöckel.

Synopsis
A young doctor and his architect friend arrive in a small town to take over the medical practice of his uncle. However the locals all stay away at first. However he eventually succeeds in turning it into a successful spa. In the process they both find love.

Cast
 Manfred Koempel-Pilot as Dr. Manfred Loberg 
 Adolf Gondrell as Karl Mohr, Architekt, sein Freund 
 Joe Stöckel as Simon Hummel - Faktotum bei Loberg 
 Helma Rückert as Monika, dessen Frau 
 Adele Sandrock as Frau Adele von Gronau 
 Philipp Veit as Neubert, Apotheker 
 Käthe Itter as Charlotte - dessen Tochter 
 Hilde Schneider as Trude Peters - Frau von Gronaus Nichte 
 Otto Fassler as Nikolaus - Chauffeur bei Frau von Gronau 
 Harry Hertzsch as Der Bürgermeister 
 Philipp Weichand as Hänfling, ein Bürger 
 Theodor Autzinger as Huber, Gemeindesekretär 
 Wastl Witt as Der Berghofbauer 
 Elisabeth Reich as Anna

References

Bibliography 
 Bock, Hans-Michael & Bergfelder, Tim. The Concise Cinegraph: Encyclopaedia of German Cinema. Berghahn Books, 2009.

External links 
 

1936 films
1936 comedy films
German comedy films
Films of Nazi Germany
1930s German-language films
Films directed by Franz Seitz
German black-and-white films
1930s German films